Negrilești is a commune located in Vrancea County, Romania. It is composed of a single village, Negrilești. Formerly part of Bârsești, it split off in 2003.

References

Communes in Vrancea County
Localities in Western Moldavia